The 2016 Formula 4 United States Championship season was the inaugural season of the United States Formula 4 Championship, a motor racing series regulated according to FIA Formula 4 regulations and sanctioned by SCCA Pro Racing, the professional racing division of the Sports Car Club of America. It began on 2 July at the Mid-Ohio Sports Car Course and finished on 10 October at the Homestead-Miami Speedway, after five triple header rounds.

Teams and drivers
All teams were American-registered.

Race calendar
The calendar was unveiled on 12 November 2015. On 4 May 2016, it was announced the first round at Lime Rock Park, to be held on 27-28 May, would be rescheduled to give drivers and teams more time to prepare themselves for the season. On 25 May it was announced the first round at the New Jersey Motorsports Park would be rescheduled, while the opening round was replaced by a second round at the Mid-Ohio Sports Car Course. All rounds were held on circuits on the East Coast of the United States. One round was part of the NASCAR Xfinity Series weekend.

Championship standings
Points were awarded to the top 10 classified finishers in each race.

Drivers' standings

Teams' championship

References

External links
 

United States F4 Championship seasons
United States
F4 United States Championship
United States F4